The Lukovit Treasure is a silver Thracian treasure.

Discovery 

It was found in 1953 near the town of Lukovit, Lovech Province, north-western Bulgaria.

Description 

It consists of two groups of objects: plates, applications for horse bridles and vessels, 9 phiales, 3 ewers and a bowl.

The objects are made of silver, some of them gilded in order to reinforce the artistic images and to put emphasis on the ornaments. Phiales and the bowl are richly adorned with ornaments, depicting floral shapes, human heads and other artistic elements. On the applications various animals are portrayed – lion, gryphon, dog, stag and others.

There are also depictions of equestrians, typical of Thracian art. On two of the plates there is a lion jumping on a deer, kneeling under the weight of the beast. Another plate depicts two horsemen chasing lions, which are already overtaken and fallen under the hoofs of the horses. These scenes in the Thracian art bear a certain social meaning. They are connected to glorifying the royal power. The rulers and their companies did spread by all possible means the legends for their exceptional divine origin and even by the trimming of the horse bridles made the common subjects to have faith and to obey.

The Lukovit Treasure is dated from 4th century BC and was made by different craftsmen. It was most probably buried in the ground during Alexander the Great's invasion of the north-western Thracian lands.

See also
Panagyurishte Treasure
Rogozen Treasure
Valchitran Treasure
Borovo Treasure

Notes

Sources 

 via- Met Publications

References 
The Lukovit silver treasure 
Lukovit treasure

1953 archaeological discoveries
History of Lovech Province
Treasure troves in Bulgaria
Silver objects
Treasure troves of classical antiquity
Ancient art in metal